Protopopov is the surname of several Russian individuals.

Alexander Protopopov (1866–1918), Russian Minister of Interior 1916–-17
Mikhail Protopopov (1848-1915), Russian journalist and literary critic
Oleg Protopopov (born 1932), Russian figure skater
The skating duo of Oleg and his wife Ludmila Belousova (born 1935) are known as The Protopopovs
Sergei Protopopov (1893–1954), Russian composer and music theorist
Vasiliy Yakovlevich Protopopov (1846-1914), mayor of Odessa
Victor Protopopov (1880–1957), Russian psychiatrist
Yakiv Protopopov, member of the Combined Bandurist Capella

Russian-language surnames